Brahmidia polymehntas is a moth in the Brahmaeidae family. It was described by Hui-Ling Hao, Xiu-Rong Zhang and Ji-Kun Yang in 2002. It is found in the Zhejiang, China.

References

Brahmaeidae
Moths described in 2002